Mateus Vicente de Oliveira (1706–1786) was a Portuguese architect. He studied under the architects João Frederico Ludovice and Jean Baptiste Robillon during the construction of the royal palace at Mafra - Portugal's attempt to rival the Spanish king's palace at Escorial.

Oliveira worked chiefly in the late Baroque and rococo styles of architecture. While he is best remembered for his design of the Palace of Queluz, on which he worked from 1742 to 1758, he also worked on many other projects. In 1779 he began work  on the Basílica da Estrela in Lisbon; this church was incomplete at the time of de Oliveira's death and work continued under the direction of Reinaldo Manuel. While Manuel was responsible for much of the classical detail of the church's exterior, the blueprint of the church is credited to de Oliveira.

Notes

References 

 Fielding, Xan. (Queluz - pages 275 – 279) Great Houses of Europe. Edited by Sacheveral Sitwell. 1961. Weidenfeld and Nicolson Ltd. London. .
 Mateus Vicente de Oliveira. Infopédia. Published by Porto Editora. Retrieved 20 November 2019 (Portuguese)
 Star Basilica. Published by Planet Ware Inc. Retrieved 11 December 2004

Portuguese architects
1706 births
1786 deaths
18th-century Portuguese people